CrossRoads Ministry is an outreach ministry of St. William Church in Louisville, Kentucky that conducts urban retreats focused on social justice.   The retreats are based on themes from the Gospel and Catholic Social Teaching.  Since its inception in 2000, CrossRoads has hosted approximately 10,000 young people on its retreats.

History

CrossRoads was established in 2000 as an outreach of St. William Church, a parish that identifies itself a "peacemaking community" in the spirit of Vatican Council II and which has founded a number of justice initiatives during its 100-year history.   Parish leaders designed CrossRoads as a way to involve its youth members in the church's activism and justice efforts.   After receiving a grant from the Sisters of Charity of Nazareth, CrossRoads hired Shannon Queenan as its first director in 2000 and began offering retreats for local high school and college students.  The organization has grown steadily since, and now hosts adult participants as well as young people.  In FY 2012–2013 CrossRoads hosted 66 groups, totaling about 1,400 participants.

Retreats

CrossRoads is situated in West Louisville, which is among the most economically depressed urban areas in the United States.  The poverty rate in West Louisville is 42%, compared with a regional average of 12.4%.   Many retreat participants are young people from suburban areas, who are often unfamiliar with West Louisville and do not know many people who live there.   On CrossRoads retreats, participants take walks around the neighborhood, visiting various social service agencies—homeless shelters, refugee resettlement facilities, and centers for people with mental disabilities—and meeting people who use services at those agencies.  Participants eat lunch at soup kitchens and interact with refugees who are enrolled in English classes.   After these visits, participants return to the retreat center, where they and retreat facilitators use prayer and reflection to process their experiences.

Whereas many organizations adopt a "helping/volunteer" model for their programs, CrossRoads retreats focus on personal interactions with people who are "at the margins."  The participants form relationships with people they might otherwise not meet, because of their different social positions.  Those "unlikely relationships," according to the organization's model, encourage participants to understand their experiences in a broader context of social justice, rather than in a context of service which might not call those societal issues into question.

CrossRoads has designed and implemented a number of different retreats, including "Footprints," a daylong retreat including a visit to a social service agency; "Follow Me," an overnight retreat including visits to 4 different social service agencies; "Send Down the Fire," which prepares Catholic groups for the sacrament of Confirmation; and "CrossWalk," a weeklong immersion experience in inner-city Louisville.

Directors
 Shannon Queenan, 2000–2003
 Fritz Gutwein, 2003–2005
 Dawn Dones, 2006–2015
 Alex Flood, Retreat Director 2013–present
 Stephanie Kaufman, Mission Development Director 2016–present

Links 
https://crossroadsministries.com

References

Religious organizations based in Louisville, Kentucky
Catholic youth organizations
Roman Catholic Archdiocese of Louisville
Christian organizations based in the United States
Social justice organizations